Jennifer Brister (born February 1975) is a British stand-up comedian, writer and actress from South West London.

Life and career

Early life
Brister was born in Kingston-upon-Thames, Greater London, in 1975 to an English father and a Spanish mother. She has three brothers. Brister was raised as a Catholic and went to all girls' Ursuline High School, Wimbledon. She then went on to Richmond College. Her overbearing Spanish mother is a frequent topic in her comedy shows.

Stand-up career
Brister studied drama at Middlesex University, London, where, in the mid-1990s, she took a course in stand-up comedy, the only one of its kind at the time in the UK. Other famous graduates include Alan Carr, Dan Renton Skinner of the Dutch Elm Conservatoire and Shooting Stars, and Clare Warde of the Runaway Lovers. Brister's first gig was at the end of her third year at university in 1996, at the King's Head in Crouch End, London.

She has performed internationally including at the Melbourne Comedy Festival in 2011 and 2014, at the Adelaide Festival in 2011 and 2012, as well as numerous times at the Edinburgh Festival. She regularly performs at clubs around the UK including Banana Cabaret, The Comedy Store (London), the Glee Clubs, Frog & Bucket, and Up the Creek. She toured the UK for the first time in 2018 with her show Meaningless.

Her comedy hero is Victoria Wood.

In 2006, Brister appeared at the 2006 Edinburgh Festival Fringe with her first show Me, My Mum and I. In Time Out, March 2006, Jen stated "It's really an exploration of my relationship with my mum. It's an analysis, as well, of where I am at this point in my life. I'm 31. I'm single. I don't own a house. Or a car. I don't have kids. Or any solid financial security. At 31, my mother had three children and a fourth on the way. She was married and she had a mortgage."

In 2007–2008, Brister worked for BBC 6 Music as a stand-in presenter, and in 2008 she took a show to Edinburgh Fringe Festival called Reception with her comedy partner at the time, Clare Warde. In 2009, Brister appeared at the Edinburgh Fringe, again doing a stand-up show as well as appearing in a play called The One and The Many by Trevor Lock. In 2011, Brister took her second solo show British(ish) to Melbourne, Adelaide and Edinburgh festivals. In 2012 Brister performed her third solo show Now and Then at the Adelaide and Edinburgh festivals, and in 2013 she performed a sell-out run at Soho Theatre, London. In 2014, Brister took her fourth show Wishful Thinking to the Free Fringe at Edinburgh, and performed it at Soho Theatre. In 2016, Brister performed her fifth show The Other One at the Camden Fringe comedy festival, and in 2017 she performed it at Soho Theatre.

In 2017, Brister performed at BBC Two's Live at The Apollo, aired in December 2017.

In 2018, Brister took her sixth show Meaningless to the Edinburgh festival, where she had a sell-out run. This was the first show she had toured around the UK.

She gave a TED talk at Brighton TEDx in 2018 titled "Changing the way we bring up our boys", addressing the cultural and gender norms taught to children.

Brister supported Frankie Boyle on his 2018 tour and was a panellist on Frankie Boyle's New World Order on BBC Two in 2019. She was a panellist on BBC Radio 4's The News Quiz in September 2018 and May 2019. She is a regular guest on podcasts like The Guilty Feminist, Global Pillage and Drunk Women Solving Crime. She also does her own podcast together with comedian Maureen Younger.

Her 2019 Edinburgh show was called Under Privilege.

In 2020 she was due to take her UK tour of Under Privilege to the Machynlleth Comedy Festival at The Tabernacle, Machynlleth.

In May 2020 Brister appeared on the TV panel show Who Said That?. In November 2021 Brister was a panelist on the BBC show Mock The Week.

In January 2022 Brister was a panelist on the BBC show QI.

Writing
Brister is also a writer and has contributed to Diva, g3, Standard Issue magazine and The Huffington Post. She has also written for BBC Scotland.

Her first book, The Other Mother - A wickedly honest parenting tale for every kind of family, was published by Penguin in 2019.

Acting
Brister's first role in a feature film was in the horror film Lair'', directed by Adam Ethan Crow.

Personal life
Brister and her partner Chloe Martin have twin boys, born in September 2014. They live in Brighton.

References

External links
 
 
 
 Jen Brister's listing at Chortle
 Jen Brister Tour dates and tickets 
 Jen Brister at Edinburgh Fringe Festival 2006
 Latitude Festival 2006 Brister also appeared at the Latitude Festival 2006 & 2018
 Jen Brister at Penguin Books

1975 births
English people of Spanish descent
English stand-up comedians
English women comedians
British LGBT comedians
English LGBT actors
Living people
People from Kingston upon Thames